Enrique Saura Gil (born 2 August 1954) is a Spanish retired footballer who played as an attacking midfielder.

In his career, he played mainly for Castellón and Valencia, appearing in more than 400 official games with the latter and winning three major titles.

Saura represented Spain at the 1982 World Cup and Euro 1980.

Club career
Saura was born in Onda, Castellón, Valencian Community. During his career, he played exclusively in his native region: after starting at CD Castellón he moved to local giants Valencia CF, where he would be an undisputed starter throughout his ten-year spell. He helped the latter win three titles in one year, most notably the 1979–80 European Cup Winners' Cup, while he added 37 goals in La Liga.

After leaving Valencia at 31, Saura returned to Castellón for a further three Segunda División seasons. He then moved to amateurs CD Onda, his very first youth club, where he retired at nearly 38.

International career
Saura earned 23 caps for Spain, the first coming on 8 November 1978 in a friendly with France. During Valencia's stellar 1979–80 he began being a regular for the national team, and was called up for the squads at both UEFA Euro 1980 and the 1982 FIFA World Cup; in the latter, he scored one of his four international goals, netting in a crucial 2–1 win against Yugoslavia after he had been in the pitch for only three minutes.

Saura also represented Spain at the 1976 Summer Olympics in Montreal, Quebec, Canada, as the nation was eliminated in the first round.

International goals

Honours
Valencia
Copa del Rey: 1978–79
UEFA Cup Winners' Cup: 1979–80
UEFA Super Cup: 1980

External links

CiberChe biography and stats 

1954 births
Living people
People from Onda
Sportspeople from the Province of Castellón
Spanish footballers
Footballers from the Valencian Community
Association football midfielders
La Liga players
Segunda División players
Tercera División players
CD Castellón footballers
Valencia CF players
Spain amateur international footballers
Spain B international footballers
Spain international footballers
UEFA Euro 1980 players
1982 FIFA World Cup players
Footballers at the 1976 Summer Olympics
Olympic footballers of Spain